Filippo Marenco (born 9 April 2003) is an Italian professional footballer who plays for  club Viterbese.

Club career 
Born in Bologna Filippo Marenco, grew up through the youth academy of the Bologna FC 1909, from which he joined the Fiorentina academy in Octobre 2020.

But after only one year playing with Fiorentina's under-18, he moved to the US Viterbese, in Viterbo, Lazio, on the 13 July 2021.

Marenco made his professional debut for Viterbese on the 15 September 2021, replacing Domenico Alberico during a 3–1 home Coppa C win against Turris. Making his Serie C debut only 4 days later, this time as a starter, he became a regular member of the Viterbese first team squad.

Marenco moved to Viterbese on a permanent basis in the summer of 2022.

References

External links

2003 births
Living people
Italian footballers
Association football defenders
Sportspeople from Bologna
U.S. Viterbese 1908 players
Serie C players